Calliostoma suduirauti is a species of sea snail, a marine gastropod mollusk in the family Calliostomatidae.

Some authors place this taxon in the subgenus Calliostoma (Ampullotrochus).

Description
The size of the shell varies between 11 mm and 15 mm.

Distribution
This marine species occurs off the Philippines.

References

External links
 

suduirauti
Gastropods described in 1997